The Fire River is a river in Algoma District in northeastern Ontario, Canada. It is in the James Bay drainage basin, and is a left tributary of the Missinaibi River.

Course
The river begins at Nameibin Lake, the location of the mouth of the Little Fire River, in geographic Moorehouse Township, and flows southeast, then turns northeast at Makadawa Lake and enters geographic Makawa Township. It continues northeast into geographic Mildred Township, then geographic Hook Township, where it takes in the right tributary Nebotik River, and enters the northwest corner of geographic Hayward Township. The river turns southeast and is paralleled by the Canadian National Railway transcontinental railway main line, a section of track traversed by freight trains and Via Rail transcontinental Canadian passenger trains. It heads past the settlement and railway point of Fire River, heads again northeast into geographic Puskuta Township then northeast into geographic Ericson Township, enters Missinaibi Provincial Park, and reaches its mouth at the Missinaibi River. The Missinaibi River flows via the Moose River to James Bay.

The river up to the crossing of the CN mainline is within the Chapleau Crown Game Preserve.

Tributaries
Puskuta Creek (left)
Dishnish Creek (left)
Nebotik River (right)
Mildred Creek (left)
Woodosgoon Creek (right)
Gay Creek (right)
Nameibin Lake (source)
Little Fire River

References

Sources

Rivers of Algoma District